Joanna Meriel Stevens (born 6 September 1966) is a Welsh politician serving as Shadow Secretary of State for Wales since 2021, and previously from 2016 to 2017. A member of the Labour Party, she has been Member of Parliament (MP) for Cardiff Central since 2015. 

Stevens previously served as Shadow Secretary of State for Wales from 2016 to 2017, and was Shadow Secretary of State for Digital, Culture, Media and Sport from 2020 to 2021.

Early life and career
Stevens was born in Swansea, West Glamorgan, Wales and grew up in Mynydd Isa, Flintshire. She attended Argoed High School and Elfed High School.

She studied law at Manchester University and completed the Solicitors' Professional Examination at Manchester Polytechnic in 1989.

Prior to becoming an MP, Stevens was People and Organisation Director of Thompsons Solicitors.

Member of Parliament 
Stevens was elected as MP for Cardiff Central on 7 May 2015 with a majority of 4,981, defeating incumbent Liberal Democrat MP Jenny Willott.

In 2014 she accused her then Liberal Democrat opponent Jenny Willott of having “neglected her constituency” by taking a ministerial role. In a 2015 interview Stevens said that, if elected, she'd be “happy as a backbench MP” adding she was “not a professional politician.” Stevens later went on to serve in the shadow cabinets of Jeremy Corbyn and Keir Starmer.

In Jeremy Corbyn's January 2016 reshuffle, she was appointed shadow solicitor general and shadow justice minister. She supported Owen Smith in the 2016 Labour Party leadership election. In the October 2016 reshuffle, after Corbyn's re-election as party leader, Stevens became Shadow Secretary of State for Wales. She resigned on 27 January 2017 in order to vote against the three-line whip obliging Labour MPs to vote in favour of Article 50. In March 2019, Stevens voted against the Labour Party whip and in favour of an amendment tabled by members of The Independent Group for a second public vote on Brexit.

Stevens chairs the GMB parliamentary group, which ensures that issues of importance to GMB members are raised in the House of Commons.

Stevens supported Keir Starmer in the 2020 Labour Party leadership election. He subsequently appointed her Shadow Secretary of State for Digital, Culture, Media and Sport, shadowing Oliver Dowden.

On 29 November 2021, she was reshuffled back to the position of Shadow Secretary of State for Wales by Keir Starmer.

Personal life
In January 2021 Stevens was treated in hospital for COVID-19.

References

External links
 
 

|-

1966 births
Living people
21st-century British women politicians
Female members of the Parliament of the United Kingdom for Welsh constituencies
Alumni of Manchester Metropolitan University
Alumni of the Victoria University of Manchester
Welsh Labour Party MPs
Members of the Parliament of the United Kingdom for Cardiff constituencies
UK MPs 2015–2017
UK MPs 2017–2019
UK MPs 2019–present
British abortion-rights activists
Politicians from Swansea
Politicians from Cardiff
People from Mold, Flintshire